The 1921 Louth by-election was a by-election held on 22 September 1921 for the British House of Commons constituency of Louth in Lincolnshire.

Vacancy
The seat had become vacant following the death of the Liberal Member of Parliament (MP) Thomas Wintringham on 8 August 1921.  He had been elected at the by-election in 1920.

Electoral history
The result at the last election was;

Candidates
The Liberals selected 41-year-old Margaret Wintringham, widow of the former MP, as their candidate to defend the seat. She worked as a teacher, before becoming headmistress of a school in Grimsby. She became a magistrate and a member of the Grimsby Education Committee. She was involved in many political movements, including the National Union of Women Workers, the British Temperance Association, the National Union of Societies for Equal Citizenship (NUSEC), the Women's Institute and the Townswomen's Guild.  She was standing for parliament for the first time. 
On 17 August, the Unionists selected 41-year-old Sir Alan Hutchings as their candidate to challenge for the seat. He was Secretary of the Department of the Director-General of Voluntary Organisations (War Office) from 1915-19.  He was standing for parliament for the first time. 
The Labour Party selected Lt. James George of Peterborough as their candidate to challenge for the seat. He was standing for parliament for the first time.

Campaign
Polling Day was set for 22 September 1921, 45 days after the death of the former MP, allowing for a long campaign. Despite rumours the contrary, on 13 September nominations closed to confirm that the election would be a three-way contest.

Hutchings received the official endorsement of the Coalition Government.

Result
Wintringham held the seat that her husband had gained for the Liberals in a by-election the year before.

Wintringham become only the second woman to take her seat in the House of Commons, and the first female Liberal MP.

Aftermath
Wintringham was re-elected at the 1922 general election:

See also
 United Kingdom by-election records
 Louth constituency
 1920 Louth by-election
 1969 Louth by-election
 List of United Kingdom by-elections (1918–1931)

References

 
 
 

Louth
Louth 1921
Louth by-election